Lake Sonoma is a reservoir west of Cloverdale in northern Sonoma County, California, created by the construction of Warm Springs Dam. The lake provides water for countywide growth and development, and for recreation. 

Activities include boating, swimming, fishing, riding, hiking, camping, and hunting. Notable features include the Milt Brandt Visitor Center, the adjacent Congressman Don Clausen Fish Hatchery, and the Warm Springs Recreation Area below the dam. Access from U.S. Route 101 is by way of Canyon Road (from the south) from Geyserville, or Dutcher Creek Road (from the north) from Cloverdale.

History
Pomo people had lived in the Dry Creek and Warm Springs region for over five thousand years. The construction of this lake destroyed 122 areas associated with the history of human use. This included ten house-pits, five hunting blinds, two chert quarries, and eleven locations with petroglyphs. In addition, there were eight known gathering spaces where, for more than a hundred years, special plants were collected by Pomo people for traditional use. Some Pomo people resisted the creation of the lake, assisting Archaeologists at Sonoma State University in writing about the prehistory and history of Warm Springs Dam, Lake Sonoma, and the Dry Creek Valley.

Warm Springs Dam
The US Army Corps of Engineers built Warm Springs Dam across Dry Creek. It contains  of earth. The dam aids in flood control, and a hydroelectric plant produces electricity from the water released downstream. A minimum amount of flow must be maintained in Dry Creek to allow fish migration.

Water quality
The California Office of Environmental Health Hazard Assessment (OEHHA) has developed a safe eating advisory for Lake Sonoma based on levels of mercury found in fish caught from this water body.

Campgrounds
Lake Sonoma offers 96 drive-in campsites and two group sites at the Liberty Glen campground.  The campground is located on a ridgeline overlooking Lake Sonoma, each campsite includes a firepit, picnic table and tent area, with primitive facilities and no potable water. The campground is closed indefinitely for repairs to infrastructure.

There are 15 secluded primitive campsites surrounding the lake: 12 can be reached by boat, horse, mountain bike or on foot, 3 can only be reached by boat and 1 due to its location on a ridge can't be accessed by boat.

Panorama

See also
Dry Creek Valley AVA
Lake Mendocino
List of dams and reservoirs in California
List of lakes in California
List of lakes in the San Francisco Bay Area
List of largest reservoirs of California

References

External links
 
news article about annual inspection of Warm Springs Dam

Sonoma
Healdsburg, California
United States Army Corps of Engineers dams
Dams in California
Dams completed in 1982
Sonoma
1982 establishments in California
Sonoma